The Top Five Foreign Language Films is one of the awards presented annually by the National Board of Review, this category is one of the few awards that is not presented individually but instead as a list of usually five films. The category was first presented in 1929 and its one of two categories for foreign language films alongside the Best Foreign Language Film award.

Initially it was awarded as just as Top Foreign Films therefore including foreign films in English but in 1990 it was modified to only reward films in a foreign language changing the name from Top Foreign Films to Top Foreign Language Films. From 1940 to 1949 the list was not presented at all.

Winners

1920s

1930s

1950s

1960s

1970s

1980s

1990s

2000s

2010s

2020s

See also
 National Board of Review Award for Best Foreign Language Film
 Academy Award for Best Foreign Language Film

References

External links
 National Board of Review of Motion Pictures: Top Foreign Films
 National Board of Review of Motion Pictures: Top 5 Foreign Language Films

National Board of Review Awards